Kennedie Center On-Hers is the sixteenth stand-up comedy special by stand-up comedian Kathy Griffin and eighteenth overall. It was her first special to feature her song I'll Say It.

Track listing

Personnel

Technical and production
Kathy Griffin - executive producer
Jenn Levy - executive producer
Paul Miller - executive producer
Kimber Rickabaugh - executive producer
Jeff U'ren - film editor
Bruce Ryan - production design
Cisco Henson - executive in charge of production
Lesley Maynard - production supervisor
Gene Crowe - associate director, stage manager
Josh Morton - dialogue editor
David Crivelli - technical supervisor
Gene Crowe - stage manager

Visuals and imagery
Ashlee Mullen - makeup artist
Charles Baker Strahan - hair stylist
Alan Adelman - lighting designer
Erica Courtney - earrings

References

External links
Kathy Griffin's Official Website

Kathy Griffin albums
Stand-up comedy albums
2013 live albums